Leif, the Discoverer  is a bronze sculpture of Leif Ericson created by American sculptor Anne Whitney in 1887. It is located at Juneau Park in Milwaukee, Wisconsin, United States.

Description

The figure is approximately 8 feet tall; the upper base is approximately 110 x 84 x 84 inches; the lower base is approximately 12 × 9 x 96 inches. The sculpture is bronze; the base is red sandstone.

Shading his eyes to scan the distance, Leif Ericson stands on a large red sandstone pedestal. Unlike other depictions of Ericson, here he is youthful and clean-shaven. He wears a scale armor shirt, ornamented with breast plates and a studded belt. Underneath, he wears a tunic and leggings with leather sandals. He carries a powder horn over his shoulder and a knife in a decorative sheath at his side. On the sandstone base, the inscription reads, Leif, the discoverer/ son of Erik/ who sailed from Iceland/ and landed on this continent/ A.D. 1000. In runic letters, it also reads, Leif, son of Erik the Red.

History
The original statue resides in Boston, Massachusetts on Commonwealth Avenue. In November 1887, the Milwaukee replica was erected; however, at the request of its donor, Mrs. Joseph Gilbert, there was no dedication ceremony. On 26 April 2003, the Sons of Norway Fosselyngen Lodge held a ceremony to celebrate the recent addition of the statue's lighting, which cost $3,800. The funds were bequested by the late lodge member, Duane Olson. The addition was a joint effort between the Sons of Norway Fosselyngen Lodge, Milwaukee County and the city of Milwaukee. Prior to this, there had been evidence of structural instability, through cracks, erosion, and the deterioration of caulking in a pedestal.

See also 

 Statue of Leif Erikson (Chicago)

References

1887 establishments in Wisconsin
1887 sculptures
Articles containing video clips
Bronze sculptures in Wisconsin
Cultural depictions of Leif Erikson
Monuments and memorials in Wisconsin
Outdoor sculptures in Milwaukee
Sculptures of men in Wisconsin
Statues in Wisconsin
Statues of explorers